Dave King (11 December 1961 in Dublin) is an Irish singer, musician and songwriter. He is currently a member of the band Flogging Molly, of which he is a founding member. He first gained notability as the original lead singer of hard rock band Fastway in the 1980s.

Roots and early life
King grew up in a small two-room flat in Beggars Bush, Dublin tenement that had once been part of Beggars Bush Barracks. When he was around the age of six or seven, his parents bought him a guitar. King remembers being called inside by his mother to watch David Bowie perform "Starman" on television, which he cites as one of many influences along with Luke Kelly, Joe Strummer, Johnny Cash, and Freddie Mercury to name a few. King's father died when he was 10 years old. He left Dublin in his twenties, briefly residing in London and then on to Los Angeles where he first joined Fastway and later formed Flogging Molly with Ted Hutt, Jeff Peters, and Bridget Regan.

Career

King's professional career began in the early 1980s when he was hired as the vocalist for Fastway, an English hard rock band formed by ex-Motörhead guitarist "Fast" Eddie Clarke and ex-UFO bassist Pete Way in 1983.

When Fastway was ostensibly disbanded (Eddie carried on the name with all new members), King formed Katmandu with Mandy Meyer (former member of the band Krokus) and Mike Alonso, (former member of the Detroit-based band Speedball), who released one self-titled album. The band had a couple of minor hits but later disbanded.

King retained a record deal with Epic records, who wanted him to sing for Jeff Beck, but he declined. He started working with forming the band Flogging Molly, with new material that had a distinct Irish sound, but still retaining the hard driving, loud and fast musical style. He asked to be let out of his Epic contract because "they wouldn't know what to do with the new music anyway..." Since then, Flogging Molly has reached position No. 4 on the Billboard charts top 200 and a No. 1 on the Billboard Indie Chart.

Personal life
King is married to fellow musician and bandmate Bridget Regan. After years together, the two married in a private ceremony in Tokyo, Japan, while on tour in 2008.

King is an avid supporter of Manchester United, and has the club's logo tattooed on his chest.

References

External links

Flogging Molly official website
MSNBC article

1961 births
Living people
20th-century American male singers
20th-century American singers
20th-century Irish male singers
20th-century guitarists
21st-century American male singers
21st-century American singers
21st-century Irish male singers
21st-century guitarists
American male guitarists
American rock guitarists
American rock singers
Bodhrán players
Fastway (band) members
Flogging Molly members
Irish emigrants to the United States
Irish male guitarists
Irish rock guitarists
Irish rock singers
Musicians from Dublin (city)